Pierre Gramegna (born 22 April 1958) is a Luxembourgish career diplomat and politician of the Democratic Party who has been serving as managing director of the European Stability Mechanism (ESM) since 2022. He previously, served as Minister for Finances in the government of Prime Minister Xavier Bettel from 2013 to 2022.

Early life and education
Gramegna was born and grew up in Esch-sur-Alzette. He then attended Panthéon-Assas University, where he studied economics and law, receiving a master's degree in civil law from the university in 1981, and a degree in economic science in 1982. He completed his postgraduate education with a DEA in community law.

Diplomatic career
Gramegna joined the Luxembourg Ministry of Foreign Affairs in 1983. He was an  economic and political affairs adviser at the Luxembourg embassy in Paris from 1988 to 1993. He was subsequently appointed consul general and director of the Board of Economic Development in San Francisco. From 1996 to 2002, Gramegna served as Luxembourg's ambassador to Japan and South Korea, before heading the Directorate for International Economic Relations at the Ministry of Foreign Affairs for a short period of time in 2002. In 2003, Gramegna became director general of the Luxembourg Chamber of Commerce, a post he held until he was asked to join the government at the end of 2013.

Political career
Following the 2013 general election in which he had not taken part, Gramegna was a surprise appointment to the Bettel–Schneider ministry as the Minister for Finances. He joined the Democratic Party shortly before being sworn in. Gramegna had been previously mostly known for his lobbyist work for the business community as well his promotional activities outside of Luxembourg in his capacity as director general of the Luxembourg Chamber of Commerce.

In November 2017, Gramegna submitted his formal application for succeeding Jeroen Dijsselbloem as the next chairman of the Eurogroup; in the vote, he lost in the second round to Mário Centeno. In 2020, he was again nominated by his government for that role, this time competing against Nadia Calviño and Paschal Donohoe.

In 2022, Gramegna became Luxembourg’s nominee to succeed Klaus Regling as Managing Director of the European Stability Mechanism; his candidacy was later endorsed by the German government. The nomination process narrowed to Gramegna and João Leão, but both pulled out in September 2022 having failed to secure the votes required. By November, Italy and France gave up their opposition to Gramegna, and he was voted by the Board to become the next managing director.

Other activities

Corporate boards
 Luxembourg Stock Exchange, Member of the Board of Directors

European Union organizations
 European Investment Bank (EIB), Ex-Officio Member of the Board of Governors (2013–2022)
 European Stability Mechanism (ESM), Member of the Board of Governors (2013–2022)

International organizations
 African Development Bank (AfDB), Ex-Officio Member of the Board of Governors (2013–2022)
 Asian Development Bank (ADB), Ex-Officio Member of the Board of Governors (2013–2022)
 Asian Infrastructure Investment Bank (AIIB), Ex-Officio Member of the Board of Governors (2016–2022)
 European Bank for Reconstruction and Development (EBRD), Ex-Officio Member of the Board of Governors (2013–2022)
 International Monetary Fund (IMF), Ex-Officio Member of the Board of Governors (2013–2022)
 Multilateral Investment Guarantee Agency (MIGA), World Bank Group, Ex-Officio Member of the Board of Governors (2013–2022)
 World Bank, Ex-Officio Member of the Board of Governors (2013–2022)

References

1958 births
Ambassadors of Luxembourg to Japan
Ambassadors of Luxembourg to South Korea
Living people
Ministers for Finances of Luxembourg
People from Esch-sur-Alzette